No Changin' Us is the fourteenth album and eighth studio album by Christian group Point of Grace. It was released on March 2, 2010.

Background
It is their first full-length recording since their 2007 release, How You Live. It is also their first full-length release since the June 2008 departure of Heather Payne reduced the group to a trio. The album was produced by Nathan Chapman, who has achieved success due to his work with country singer Taylor Swift. The album features a more country-oriented sound, due to the group's growing acceptance within the country music market.

The album's lead single, "Come to Jesus", was released on February 2, 2010. The track "The Greatest Show On Earth" was written by the group along with Cindy Morgan and Julie Adkison. The track "A Good Place to Turn Around" was originally recorded by country singer Kayla King.

Awards
The album won a Dove Award for Country Album of the Year at the 42nd GMA Dove Awards. The song "There Is Nothing Greater Than Grace" also won for Country Recorded Song of the Year.

Track listing

Personnel 

Point of Grace
 Shelley Breen – vocals
 Leigh Capillino – vocals
 Denise Jones – vocals

Musicians
 Tony Harrell – keyboards (1-4, 6-11)
 Kenny Greenberg – electric guitar (1, 3-10)
 B. James Lowery – acoustic guitar (1, 3-10)
 Bryan Sutton – acoustic guitar (1, 3, 5, 10), mandolin (3, 8, 10), banjo (8)
 Nathan Chapman – backing vocals (3), acoustic guitar (5, 11), keyboards (5), bass (5), electric guitar (6, 8, 11), percussion (6, 8), mandolin (11), tambourine (11)
 Stephanie Chapman – acoustic guitar (5)
 Mike Johnson – steel guitar (1, 3, 8, 10), dobro (5, 6)
 Dan Dugmore – steel guitar (4, 7, 9), percussion (7)
 Ilya Toshinsky – banjo (6), mandolin (7)
 Glenn Worf – bass (1, 3, 4, 6-10)
 Shannon Forrest – drums (1, 3, 5, 10)
 Nick Buda – drums (4, 6-9, 11)
 Eric Darken – percussion (1, 3, 4, 9, 10)
 Rob Hajacos – fiddle (1, 3-10)
 Chris Carmichael – strings (3, 4, 7, 11)

Production 
 Producer – Nathan Chapman
 A&R – Josh Bailey, Jamie Kiner and Kirsten Wines
 Assistant Producer on Tracks 4, 7, 9 & 11 – Emily Mueller
 Recorded by Derek Bason (Tracks 1, 2, 3, 5 & 10); Chad Carlson (Tracks 4, 7, 9 & 11); Clark Schleicher (6 & 8).
 Assistant Recording – Todd Tidwell (Tracks 1, 2, 3, 5, 6, 8, 10 & 11); Nathan Yarborough (Tracks 4, 7 & 9); Shawn Dougherty (Tracks 6 & 8).
 Additional Recording on Track 5 – Nathan Chapman
 Additional Engineer on Track 5 – Brian David Willis
 Recorded at Starstruck Studios, Pain In The Art Studios, Jane's Place, Blackbird Studios, The Ice Box and I.T. Studios (Nashville, TN); Stonehurst Studios (Bowling Green, KY).
 Mastered by Jim DeMain at Yes Master Studio (Nashville, Tennessee).
 Creative Director – Katherine Petillo
 Art Direction and Design – Don Bailey
 Photography – Kristin Barlowe
 Stylist – Amber Lehman
 Hair Stylist – Debbie Dover
 Make-up – Sheila Davis Curti

Chart performance

Singles
 "Come To Jesus" #7
 "There Is Nothing Greater Than Grace" #12
 "Love And Laundry" #15

References

2010 albums
Point of Grace albums
Word Records albums
Albums produced by Nathan Chapman (record producer)